Chashniki District, or Čašniki District is a district in the Vitebsk Region, Belarus.

Lake Lukomlskoye, the fourth largest lake in the country is situated here.

Notable residents 
 Wasyl Ciapiński (c. 1430/1540s, Ciapina village – c. 1599/1600), Belarusian-Lithuanian noble, humanist, educator, writer, publisher and translator from the Grand Duchy of Lithuania known for translating the Bible into the Belarusian language
 Uladzimyer Prakulevich (1887, Krasnaluki village – 1938), Belarusian politician, writer and lawyer, victim of Stalin’s purges

References

 
Districts of Vitebsk Region